The 1997 Sutherland state by-election was held on 20 December 1997 for the New South Wales Legislative Assembly electorate of Sutherland following the retirement of sitting member, Chris Downy.

Result

Chris Downy resigned.

See also
Electoral results for the district of Sutherland
List of New South Wales state by-elections

References

1997 elections in Australia
New South Wales state by-elections
1990s in New South Wales